Horseshoe Lagoon is a rural locality in the Shire of Burdekin, Queensland, Australia.

History 
The locality was named and bounded on 23 February 2001. It is presumably named after the small lagoon in the west of the locality, which is locally known as Horseshoe Lagoon (now protected within the Horseshoe Lagoon Conservation Park).

Geography
The Haughton River forms part of the western boundary. Horseshoe Lagoon (the body of water) is in the west of the locality adjacent to the river.

Road infrastructure
The Bruce Highway runs through from east to west.

References 

Shire of Burdekin
Localities in Queensland